The Israel LaFleur Bridge is a concrete pillar vehicular bridge located in Lake Charles, Louisiana. The bridge was built in 1962 as part of Interstate 210 (Lake Charles Loop; a highway expansion that travels over the Calcasieu River, south of Lake Charles, and back up to Interstate 10). It is named after Israel LaFleur, who spearheaded the project to build it.

It is one of the tallest structures in southwest Louisiana.

The bridge survived the fourth-most intense Atlantic hurricane ever recorded and the most intense tropical cyclone ever observed in the Gulf of Mexico, Hurricane Rita. The bridge's structural rating is 96%, even after surviving two major hurricanes.

See also

References

External links
 

Bridges completed in 1962
Buildings and structures in Lake Charles, Louisiana
Road bridges in Louisiana
Bridges on the Interstate Highway System
Concrete bridges in the United States
1962 establishments in Louisiana